High Korean may refer to:
Korean ruling class
Yangban, the traditional Korean nobility

In linguistics:
Prestige dialects of the Korean language, namely:
Seoul dialect, the prestige dialect in South Korea
Pyongan dialect, the prestige dialect in North Korea
Korean honorifics' highest registers